(meaning 'curved cake'; plural ) is a Norwegian waffle cookie made of flour, butter, eggs, sugar, and cream.

A special decorative two-sided iron griddle similar to a waffle iron is traditionally used to bake the thin round cakes, similar to Italian pizelle and Sicilian cannolo. Older irons are used over the stove, but modern electric irons offer the convenience of nonstick surfaces, automatic timing, and multiple cakes per batch. While hot, the 13–20 cm  are rolled into small cones around a wooden or plastic cone form.  can be eaten plain or filled with whipped cream (often multekrem) or other fillings.

These cookies are popular not only in Norway but due to contributions of Norwegian immigrants and their descendants they are found in the cuisines of New England and the American Midwest.  are traditionally made in preparation for Christmas, along with other cookies of Nordic origin including sandbakelse and rosettes. They offer a sweet dessert after the traditional Christmas Eve dinner.

In Germany, the cookies are commonly filled with sweet stuffings. They are also used as a type of ice cream cone.

See also

References

Norwegian desserts
German desserts
Cookies
Christmas food
Cuisine of Minnesota